is a Japanese professional basketball player for the Los Angeles Lakers of the National Basketball Association (NBA). He played college basketball for the Gonzaga Bulldogs and is a member of the Japanese national team. He plays both the small forward and power forward positions. After being selected ninth overall by the Washington Wizards in the 2019 NBA draft, he was named to the NBA All-Rookie Second Team in 2020. 

Born in Toyama Prefecture, Hachimura achieved success at the youth level in Japan, leading Meisei High School to three straight All-Japan High School Tournament titles and being a top player for the Japanese under-17 and under-19 national teams in FIBA competition. He joined Gonzaga in 2016 as the fifth Japanese-born men's NCAA Division I player and in 2017 became the first Japanese national to play in the NCAA Division I men's tournament. As a sophomore, he earned first-team All-WCC honors. He was named a finalist for the Naismith Player of the Year.

Early life and career

Hachimura was born in Toyama Prefecture in Japan to a Japanese mother,  and Beninese father, Zakari Jabil. His given name, means "base" or "fortress" in Japanese; the name was given to him by his grandfather because he was a big fan of baseball (the character 塁 is also used for "base" in context of baseball). His surname is from his mother's family register. He has three younger siblings – one brother and two sisters. Hachimura's younger brother, played basketball at Tokai University in Japan. In his childhood, he played baseball as a catcher and pitcher. On December 29, 2013, Hachimura led the Meisei High School basketball team to its second title in the All-Japan High School Tournament, scoring 32 points in a 92–78 win over Fukuoka University Ohori. In 2014, he helped his team win the tournament for a second straight year. In April 2015, Hachimura was invited to the Jordan Brand Classic, where he recorded nine points and five rebounds in the International Game. 

On November 21, 2015, he signed a National Letter of Intent to play college basketball for the Gonzaga Bulldogs in the US, being considered by ESPN as one of the best international players entering college. On December 29, 2015, Hachimura posted 34 points, 19 rebounds and three blocks to guide Meisei past  for his third All-Japan Tournament victory.

Despite signing with Gonzaga in the early signing period for 2016, Hachimura's eligibility to play college basketball was called into question. The concerns were that he needed to acclimate better culturally and linguistically to the US and would potentially need to attend a prep school before entering Gonzaga or redshirting if eligible. In February 2016, Hachimura claimed to understand 80 percent of English but speak only 30–40 percent of it. By April 2016, Hachimura was still studying for the SAT to gain entrance to college. In May 2016, Hachimura announced that he met the SAT and GPA requirements to be eligible to play at Gonzaga beginning as early as fall 2016. He planned to play as a true freshman and did not redshirt his first year.

College career
Hachimura made his regular season debut for the Gonzaga Bulldogs on November 11, 2016, against Utah Valley, recording one point and three rebounds in four minutes. As a result, he became the fifth Japanese-born player to ever play NCAA Division I basketball. On December 1, he scored a season-high 10 points in 13 minutes in a 97–63 win over Mississippi Valley State. Hachimura scored eight points on February 23, 2017, against San Diego, helping his team win the West Coast Conference (WCC) title. On March 16, 2017, after playing one minute against South Dakota State, he became the first Japanese native to ever appear in the NCAA Division I men's tournament. Through 28 games as a freshman, Hachimura averaged 2.6 points and 1.4 rebounds while shooting 53 percent from the field in 4.6 minutes per game.

In the 2017–18 campaign, Hachimura appeared in 37 games for Gonzaga, including two starts, averaging 11.6 points and 4.7 rebounds per contest.

Coming into his junior season, Hachimura was named to the Preseason All-WCC Team. He opened the regular season on November 6, 2018 by scoring 33 points in a 120–79 win over Idaho State. On November 21, 2018, Hachimura recorded 20 points, 7 rebounds, and 5 assists to help upset No. 1-ranked Duke in the Maui Invitational finals. Subsequently, he was named most valuable player of the tournament. Hachimura was selected the 2019 WCC Player of the Year. He led Gonzaga in scoring (19.7 points per game) during the 2018-19 season and also averaged 6.5 rebounds a contest.

Professional career

Washington Wizards (2019–2023)

On April 15, 2019, Hachimura announced that he would forgo his final year of eligibility and declared for the 2019 NBA draft, where he was drafted ninth overall by the Washington Wizards. Hachimura was the second Japanese-born player to be drafted into the NBA after Yasutaka Okayama, who was drafted 171st overall in the 1981 NBA draft, and also the first Japanese player ever taken in the first round. On October 23, 2019, Hachimura made his NBA debut, posting a double-double (14 points, 10 rebounds) as a starter in a 100–108 loss to the Dallas Mavericks. On December 1, 2019, Hachimura scored a career-high 30 points in a 125–150 loss to the Los Angeles Clippers along with nine rebounds, three assists and a steal. 

In December 2019, he and Yuta Watanabe of the Memphis Grizzlies became the first pair of Japanese players to face each other in the NBA. Hachimura suffered a groin injury against the Detroit Pistons on December 16 and had surgery and missed several games. On September 15, Hachimura was named to the second-team NBA All-Rookie Team.

On March 30, 2021, Hachimura tied his career high of 30 points in a 104–114 loss to the Charlotte Hornets. On May 23, he made his playoff debut during the first round, recording 12 points and five rebounds in a 118–125 Game 1 loss to the Philadelphia 76ers. On May 31, Hachimura logged 20 points and a career-high 13 rebounds in a 122–114 Game 4 win. The Wizards ended up losing the series in five games.

On September 25, 2021, the Wizards announced that Hachimura had been excused from the start of training camp due to personal reasons. He made his season debut on January 9, 2022, recording six points and three rebounds in a 102–100 win over the Orlando Magic. During the 2021–22 NBA season, Hachimura played 42 games while averaging 11.3 points per game, 3.8 rebounds per game, and 1.1 assists per game. This represented a slight dip in his career averages. However, his three-point shooting improved dramatically: Hachimura's 44.7 percent rate was second only to Luke Kennard (44.9 percent) among NBA players with at least 100 attempts.

On January 21, 2023, in his last game before being traded, Hachimura recorded a career-high tying 30 points, alongside five rebounds and two blocks, in a 138–118 win over the Orlando Magic.

Los Angeles Lakers (2023–present)
On January 23, 2023, Hachimura was traded to the Los Angeles Lakers in exchange for Kendrick Nunn and three future second-round draft picks. Hachimura made his Lakers debut two days later, recording 12 points and 6 rebounds in a 113–104 win over the San Antonio Spurs.

National team career

Junior national team
Hachimura represents Japan internationally. At the 2013 FIBA Asia U16 Championship in Iran, he averaged 22.8 points, 12.6 rebounds and 2.8 blocks through eight contests, guiding his team to a third-place finish. In April 2014, he played the Albert-Schweitzer-Tournament in Germany with Japan's under 18 national team, finishing in last place.

Japan finished the 2014 FIBA U17 World Championships 14th of 16 teams, with Hachimura scoring a tournament-high 22.6 points per game, while pulling down 6.6 rebounds and blocking 1.7 shots per contest. During the tournament, he scored 25 points on the USA team that went on to win the title; that team included four players who were chosen in the 2017 NBA draft—Jayson Tatum, Josh Jackson, Caleb Swanigan, and Ivan Rabb—plus other future college stars such as Diamond Stone and Malik Newman.
Hachimura competed for Japan in the 2017 FIBA Under-19 Basketball World Cup, averaging team-bests 20.6 points and 11.0 rebounds a contest.

Senior national team

In a qualification round for the 2019 FIBA World Cup, Hachimura scored 25 points to help Japan defeat Iran 70-56.

Hachimura scored a game high 34 points in a loss to Slovenia during the preliminary round of the 2020 Olympics in Tokyo.

Personal life
Hachimura has been subjected to online racism by Japanese ethnic nationalists, once noting on Twitter that “Messages like this come almost every day,” referring to anti-black insults that his brother discussed receiving.

Career statistics

NBA

Regular season

|-
| style="text-align:left;"|
| style="text-align:left;"|Washington
| 48 || 48 || 30.1 || .466 || .287 || .829 || 6.1 || 1.8 || .8 || .2 || 13.5
|-
| style="text-align:left;"|
| style="text-align:left;"|Washington
| 57 || 57 || 31.5 || .478 || .328 || .770 || 5.5 || 1.4 || .8 || .1 || 13.8
|-
| style="text-align:left;"|
| style="text-align:left;"|Washington
| 42 || 13 || 22.5 || .491 || .447 || .697 || 3.8 || 1.1 || .5 || .2 || 11.3
|-
| style="text-align:left;"|
| style="text-align:left;"|Washington
| 30 || 0 || 24.3 || .488 || .337 || .759 || 4.3 || 1.2 || .4 || .4 || 13.0
|- class="sortbottom"
| style="text-align:center;" colspan="2"|Career
| 177 || 118 || 27.8 || .479 || .356 || .776 || 5.1 || 1.4 || .6 || .2 || 13.0

Playoffs

|-
| style="text-align:left;"|2021
| style="text-align:left;"|Washington
| 5 || 5 || 34.6 || .617 || .600 || .583 || 7.2 || 1.0 || .4 || .2 || 14.8
|- class="sortbottom"
| style="text-align:center;" colspan="2"|Career
| 5 || 5 || 34.6 || .617 || .600 || .583 || 7.2 || 1.0 || .4 || .2 || 14.8

College

|-
| style="text-align:left;"|2016–17
| style="text-align:left;"|Gonzaga
| 28 || 0 || 4.6 || .528 || .286 || .542 || 1.4 || .1 || .2 || .1 || 2.6
|-
| style="text-align:left;"|2017–18
| style="text-align:left;"|Gonzaga
| 37 || 2 || 20.7 || .568 || .192 || .795 || 4.7 || .6 || .5 || .5 || 11.6
|-
| style="text-align:left;"|2018–19
| style="text-align:left;"|Gonzaga
| 37 || 37 || 30.2 || .591 || .417 || .739 || 6.5 || 1.5 || .9 || .7 || 19.7
|- class="sortbottom"
| style="text-align:center;" colspan="2"|Career
| 102 || 39 || 19.7 || .579 || .316 || .746 || 4.4 || .8 || .6 || .5 || 12.1

References

External links

 Gonzaga Bulldogs bio

1998 births
Living people
2019 FIBA Basketball World Cup players
All-American college men's basketball players
Basketball players at the 2020 Summer Olympics
Black Lives Matter people
Gonzaga Bulldogs men's basketball players
Japanese expatriate basketball people in the United States
Japanese human rights activists
Japanese men's basketball players
Japanese people of Beninese descent
Los Angeles Lakers players
National Basketball Association players from Japan
Olympic basketball players of Japan
Power forwards (basketball)
Sendai University Meisei High School alumni
Small forwards
Sportspeople from Sendai
Sportspeople from Toyama Prefecture
Sportspeople of Beninese descent
Washington Wizards draft picks
Washington Wizards players